Vera Kock (born 17 May 1952) is a Swedish former swimmer. She competed in the women's 100 metre freestyle at the 1968 Summer Olympics.

References

External links
 

1952 births
Living people
Olympic swimmers of Sweden
Swimmers at the 1968 Summer Olympics
People from Ostholstein
Swedish female freestyle swimmers